Penicillium resedanum is an anamorph species of fungus in the genus Penicillium which produces monorden.

References

Further reading 
 
 
 

resedanum
Fungi described in 1954